AIM Media Management is a media company based in Dallas, Texas. Through its subsidiaries AIM Media Indiana, AIM Media Midwest (also known as Digital AIM Media), and AIM Media Texas, it publishes dozens of daily and weekly newspapers in Indiana, Ohio, and Texas, respectively. The company was founded by Jeremy Halbreich in 2012 to acquire Freedom Communications holdings and later acquired additional newspapers.

References 

2012 establishments in Texas
American companies established in 2012
Publishing companies established in 2012
Companies based in Dallas